Reginald Fidelas Vincent Freeman (20 December 1893 – 4 August 1955) was an English football player and manager.

Career

Player
Freeman played 104 times for Oldham Athletic, making his debut in January 1921 against Bolton Wanderers. Freeman joined Middlesbrough from the Latics in May 1923 for £3,600. Whilst playing left-back for Middlesbrough, the team won the Second Division title in 1926–27 in impressive fashion, scoring 122 goals in 42 league games. He made 29 league appearances that season. Freeman missed the majority of the following season through injury as Middlesbrough were relegated from the First Division, but he would win another Second Division title in 1928–29 with the club. In total Freeman spent seven seasons playing at Ayresome Park before leaving for Rotherham United for £150 in 1930, where he became player-manager in 1934. He played war-time football for Liverpool as well.

Manager
Freeman was manager for Rotherham United from 1934 to 1952. Rotherham finished as runners-up three time in succession between 1947 and 1949 and then were champions of the Third Division North in 1950–51. He was appointed as manager of Sheffield United for the 1952–53 season, and immediately led the club to the Second Division title. United narrowly avoid relegation in 1953–54, finishing 20th in the First Division. Other season highlights include the debut of goalkeeper Alan Hodgkinson, plus the first floodlit game at Bramall Lane since the 19th century. Two big defeats early in the 1954–55 season caused concern, but United completed the league double over Steel City derby rivals Wednesday on their way to a 13th-place finish. However Freeman was taken ill and died before the start of the 1955–56 season.

Career statistics

Honours

Player
Middlesbrough
Football League Second Division champions: 1926–27, 1928–29

Manager
Rotherham United
Football League Third Division North champions: 1950–51

Sheffield United
Football League Second Division champions: 1952–53

References

1893 births
1955 deaths
Northern Nomads F.C. players
Oldham Athletic A.F.C. players
Middlesbrough F.C. players
Rotherham United F.C. players
English Football League players
English football managers
Rotherham United F.C. managers
Sheffield United F.C. managers
English Football League managers
English footballers
Association football fullbacks